Anonychomyrma gigantea is a species of ant in the genus Anonychomyrma. Described by Donisthorpe in 1943, the species is endemic to New Guinea.

References

Anonychomyrma
Insects of New Guinea
Insects described in 1943
Endemic fauna of New Guinea